The 1918 Oregon Agricultural Aggies football team represented Oregon Agricultural College (now known as Oregon State University) in the Pacific Coast Conference (PCC) during the 1918 college football season. In their first season under head coach Homer Woodson Hargiss, the Aggies compiled a 2–4 record (0–2 against PCC opponents), finished in last place in the PCC, and were outscored by their opponents by a combined total of 46 to 33. The team played its home games at Bell Field in Corvallis, Oregon. Meier Newman was the team captain.

Schedule

References

Oregon Agricultural
Oregon State Beavers football seasons
Oregon Agricultural Aggies football